Birkirkara Alligators RFC is a Maltese rugby club in Birkirkara. They currently compete in the Malta Rugby Union Championship.

History
The club was founded in 1990 as the Malta University RFC. In 1995 the name of the club changed due to many of the founding members graduating from the university. They were initially sponsored by the Alley Bar in Paceville, leading to the name of Alleygators RFC.

External links
Birkirkara Alligators RFC

Maltese rugby union teams
Rugby clubs established in 1990
Sport in Birkirkara